Craig Merren (born 6 November 1966) is a Caymanian former cyclist. He competed at the 1984 Summer Olympics, 1988 Summer Olympics and the 1992 Summer Olympics.

References

External links
 

1966 births
Living people
Caymanian male cyclists
Olympic cyclists of the Cayman Islands
Cyclists at the 1984 Summer Olympics
Cyclists at the 1988 Summer Olympics
Cyclists at the 1992 Summer Olympics
Place of birth missing (living people)